Derby Dinner Playhouse is a dinner theatre located in Clarksville, Indiana, that opened in 1974. The Derby is the only dinner theatre in the Louisville, Kentucky, area and in southern Indiana.

History
In the early 1970s, several local business owners saw the need for an entertainment center that could host convention business, concerts and theatre productions. The Windmill Dinner Theatre group, which owned dinner theatres in Cincinnati and Indianapolis, constructed and managed the facility. Carolyn Thomas, then Derby General Manager, partnered with Bekki Jo Schneider to buy the center in 1985. As of 2009, Thomas was retired, but she and Schneider, who produces and oversees all aspects of the business, still own over 50% of the company. The other half is owned by small investors.

Food
Derby Dinner offers a freshly prepared homestyle American buffet featuring fried chicken, fish, roast beef, a salad bar, hot rolls and beverages. Bountiful desserts, including the famous peanut butter pie, are a tradition.  A full bar is also available. The "Footnotes" vocal ensemble entertains patrons prior to the performance.

Facility
The venue uses the theatre-in-the-round configuration, and the actors are professionals. Performances are on Tuesday through Sunday nights, with matinées on Wednesday and Sunday. Each year, the Derby presents eight mainstage shows, four Children's productions and ten concerts.

See also
 List of attractions and events in the Louisville metropolitan area
 List of dinner theaters

References

External links
Official site

Arts venues in Louisville, Kentucky
Clarksville, Indiana
Theatres in Indiana
Dinner theatre
Buildings and structures in Clark County, Indiana
Tourist attractions in Clark County, Indiana
Theatres completed in 1974
1974 establishments in Kentucky